Rhoda Jordan is an actress and screenwriter from Los Angeles, California, who has appeared in Never Die Alone with DMX, Aquanoids and Death Factory with Tiffany Shepis. She is of African American and Filipino descent.

Rhoda Jordan wrote the screenplay for and played a supporting role in the film Rule of Three, which had its world premiere in July 2008 at the Fantasia Festival, and its U.S. premiere in September 2008 at Fantastic Fest.

In 2011, Jordan produced a short film adaptation of Jack Ketchum's short story "Mail Order."

Jordan is the sister of jazz guitarist Stanley Jordan and the wife of writer-director Eric Shapiro.

References

External links
 

Living people
African-American screenwriters
American actresses of Filipino descent
21st-century American actresses
American women screenwriters
African-American actresses
American film actresses
21st-century African-American women
21st-century African-American people
20th-century African-American people
20th-century African-American women
African-American women writers
Year of birth missing (living people)